Dennis Gaitsgory is a professor of mathematics at Harvard University known for his research on the geometric Langlands program. 

Born in Chișinău, now in Moldova, he grew up in Tajikistan, before studying at Tel Aviv University under Joseph Bernstein (1990–1996).  He received his doctorate in 1997 for a thesis entitled "Automorphic Sheaves and Eisenstein Series". He has been awarded a Harvard Junior Fellowship, a Clay Research Fellowship, and the prize of the European Mathematical Society for his work.

His work in geometric Langlands culminated in a joint 2002 paper with Edward Frenkel and Kari Vilonen, establishing the conjecture for finite fields, and a separate 2004 paper, generalizing the proof to include the field of complex numbers as well.

Prior to his 2005 appointment at Harvard, he was an associate professor at the University of Chicago from 2001–2005.

Selected publications

References

External links 
 
 Gaitsgory's thesis

Living people
Year of birth missing (living people)
Scientists from Chișinău
Tel Aviv University alumni
University of Chicago faculty
Harvard University faculty
20th-century American mathematicians
21st-century American mathematicians
Israeli mathematicians
Israeli people of Russian-Jewish descent
Max Planck Institute directors